Yvan Quénin (March 1, 1920 – July 2009) was a French basketball player who competed in the 1948 Summer Olympics. He was part of the French basketball team, which won the silver medal.

References

External links
Yvan Quénin's profile at databaseOlympics

1920 births
2009 deaths
French men's basketball players
Olympic basketball players of France
Basketball players at the 1948 Summer Olympics
Olympic silver medalists for France
Olympic medalists in basketball
Knights of the Ordre national du Mérite
Medalists at the 1948 Summer Olympics